Aaron (Aharon) S. Klieman (July 27, 1939 – June 17, 2021) was an American-born Israeli historian of international relations who developed the field of international affairs in Israel and abroad. Klieman researched a wide variety of fields in political science including history, arms sales, and geopolitics. He was the Dr. Nahum Goldmann Chair in Diplomacy and lecturer on international relations in the Department of Political Science at Tel-Aviv University, and was the founding director of the Abba Eban Graduate Program in Diplomatic Studies. A native of Chicago, Illinois, his PhD is from The Johns Hopkins University School of Advanced International Studies, with an M.A. from the School of International Affairs at Columbia University in Middle Eastern studies.

Klieman wrote and edited 24 books, monographs, and documentary collections in English and Hebrew, and has authored over 30 book chapters in addition to journal articles.  He was also a senior editor of the Israel Journal of Foreign Affairs.

Academic career 
In 1969 Klieman accepted an offer from Tel Aviv University to join as a lecturer in the Department of Political Science, eventually becoming the head of the department. He taught a wide variety of undergraduate and graduate courses for more than 50 years. Klieman initiated the "Round Table - Ambassadors Forum", which holds periodic meetings between ambassadors to Israel and students in the department while creating a bridge between them and exposing students to diplomats from Israel and the world. In addition, he established the "International Forum" - an apolitical forum open to students, faculty, and the general public to address core issues in Israeli relations and the international arena. In 2001, Klieman founded and headed the "Abba Eben Program of Graduate Studies in Diplomacy."

Klieman was appointed the Nahum Goldmann Chair in Diplomacy Studies at Tel Aviv University between the years 1997-2009. He was a research fellow at the Moshe Dayan Center and at the JCSS – Jaffee Center for Strategic Studies (now INSS) at Tel Aviv University. He was the first professor from the State of Israel in the Department of Government at Georgetown University in Washington D.C., (1979-1980; 1984-1985), and continued teaching summer courses there for 30 years. In addition, he was a guest lecturer at the Universities of Chicago (1994-1995), Denver (1997), Michigan (Ann Arbor) (2000-2001), California (UCLA) (2005-2006), Brown (2008) and Trinity College (Ireland) (2010).

He was also a supporter of and active in "Track II diplomacy," informal meetings between Israeli representatives and representatives from Arab countries and the Palestinian Authority through an academic channel. Negotiations between Israelis and Palestinians also concerned him.

Upon his retirement in 2007, Klieman established the Department of Politics and Government at Ashkelon Academic College bringing high-level academics to the periphery in Israel.

Published works 
America, the Balance of Power, and the post-1945 World Order, The Jerusalem Strategic Tribune, September–October, 2021, pages 10–22, number 1. Washington, D.C.- Jerusalem, Israel 
First Among the Nations?  A Cautionary against Triumphalism in Israeli Foreign Policy, The Israel Journal of Foreign Affairs, Volume Fifteen, 2021, 5781, Number One, Routledge. pages 3–20.
Routledge Handbook on Israeli Security, co-editor with Professor Stuart A. Cohen, Routledge Publishers, 2019
Great Powers & Geopolitics in a Rebalancing World. Editor, (Springer, 2015) 
Global Politics. Essays on Contemporary Jewish History and Diplomacy in Honor of Professor David Vital. With Professor Abraham Ben-Zvi. Frank Cass, 2001 
Compromising Palestine. A Guide to Final Status Negotiations. Columbia University Press, 2000 
Constructive Ambiguity in Middle East Peace-Making. The Tami Steinmetz Center for Peace Research, 1999 
Security Concerns. Insights From The Israeli Experience. Daniel Bar-Tal, Dan Jacobson and Aharon Klieman (eds.). JAI Press, 1998 
Democracy: The Challenges Ahead. Co-editor, with Yossi Shain.   Macmillan, 1997 
Approaching the Finish Line: The United States in Post-Oslo Peace Making, Bar Ilan University: BESA Center for Strategic Studies, monograph in its Mideast Security and Policy Studies series, No. 22, June 1995 
The Gulf Crisis and its Global Aftermath. Co-editor, with Gad Barzilai and Gil Shidlo. Routledge, 1993  Reissued (2016) 
Deterrence in the Middle East, Where Theory and Practice Converge, Co-editor with Ariel Levite, published by JCSS, Jaffee Center for Strategic Studies, 1993 
A Double-Edged Sword. Israeli Defense Exports in the 1990's. Am Oved,  1992 (in Hebrew)
Rearming Israel: Defense Procurement through the 1990s, published by JCSS, Jaffee Center for Strategic Studies, 1991 
Israel and the World After Forty Years. Pergamon-Brassey's, 1990 
Statecraft in the Dark: Israel’s Practice of Quiet Diplomacy, Westview Press, June 1988 
Israel and Jordan: Coexistence Without Peace. Maariv Publishing House, 1986
Israel's Global Reach. Arms Sales as Diplomacy. Pergamon - Brassey's, 1985 
Israel Arms Sales: Perspectives and Prospects, published by JCSS, Jaffee Center for Strategic Studies, February 1984
Divide or Rule. Britain's Attempt at Partitioning Palestine,  1936-1939. Ben-Zvi Institute, 1983
Israel, Jordan, Palestine: The Search for a Durable Peace, The Georgetown University Center for Strategic and International Studies, Sage Publications, 1981 
Emergency Politics: The Growth of Crisis Government. The London Institute for the Study of Conflict, 1976 
Soviet Russia and the Middle East.  The Johns Hopkins Press, 1970 
Foundations of British Policy in the Arab World. The Johns Hopkins Press, 1970 
When Israelis and Palestinians Negotiate. A Practitioner’s Handbook. Institute for Diplomacy and Regional Cooperation, Tel-Aviv University (unpublished) 
Square One: The Great Palestine Divide, 1937 and Since (unfinished manuscript)
Jewish Statecraft: Reflections on Jewish International Relations and Diplomacy (unfinished manuscript)

Edited documentary collections
American Zionism. A Documentary History (with Adrian L. Klieman),  Fifteen volumes. Garland Publishing, 1991
The Rise of Israel. A Documentary Record from the Nineteenth Century to 1948, Fourteen volumes. Garland Publishing, 1987
Letters and Papers of Chaim Weizmann. Vol. 23 (edited and annotated, with introductory chapter). Transaction Books and Israel Universities Press. 340 pp., 1980
Letters and Papers of Chaim Weizmann. Vol. 18 (edited and annotated, with introductory chapter). Transaction Books and Israel Universities Press. 513 pp., 1979

Articles in encyclopedias
Encyclopedia of World Biography, Entries on Shimon Peres, Yitzhak Rabin, Yitzhak Shamir, Ariel Sharon, Ezer Weizman
"Arms Sales", pp. 47–79. Political Dictionary of the State of  Israel, Susan Hattis Rolef (Ed.), MacMillan, 1987
Political Dictionary of the Middle East in the Twentieth Century, Yaakov Shimoni and Evyatar Levine (ed.), 1972. British Interests and Policies in the Middle East, pp. 79–84 & Russian Interests and Policies in the Middle East, pp. 330– 333

References 

1939 births
2021 deaths
Academics from Chicago
American emigrants to Israel
International relations historians
Israeli historians
Academic staff of Tel Aviv University
Johns Hopkins University alumni
School of International and Public Affairs, Columbia University alumni
Roosevelt University alumni